Joseph Frederick Green (5 July 1855 – 1 May 1932) was a British politician. He sat in the House of Commons from 1918 to 1922 as the Member of Parliament (MP) for Leicester West.

Green worked as a curate in his youth, but later left the church. He became involved in politics through the Liberal Party, serving as secretary of the St George's Hanover Square Liberal Association, and on the committee of the National Liberal Club.  In the 1890s, he instead joined the Independent Labour Party and the Fabian Society, serving on its executive in 1899/1900.  Around this time, he also served as secretary of the International Arbitration Association, and of the Friends of Russian Freedom.

In the 1900s, Green joined the Social Democratic Federation (SDF), serving as its treasurer for a time.  He resigned in 1911 in protest at H. M. Hyndman's calls for the Royal Navy to be enlarged.  However, his views changed dramatically with the outbreak of World War I, and he joined the Socialist National Defence Committee, a pro-war split from the SDF's successor, the British Socialist Party.  A supporter of Victor Fisher, he followed him into the British Workers League, before joining the National Democratic and Labour Party (NDP).

Standing as a candidate of the NDP, with support of the Liberal-led and Conservative-dominated coalition government, Green contested the newly created Leicester West constituency at the 1918 general election. His only opponent was the Labour Party candidate Ramsay MacDonald, a sitting MP for the two-seat Leicester constituency until it was divided for this election.

With coalition support, Green won 76% of the votes, defeating MacDonald.
However, at the 1922 general election, without coalition support, Green stood as a National Liberal Party candidate. He won only 28.4% of the votes, and lost his seat to the Labour Party candidate Alfred Hill. Green did not stand again. Instead, he joined the Conservative Party, and found work at its headquarters.

References

External links 
 

1855 births
1932 deaths
Conservative Party (UK) politicians
Members of the Parliament of the United Kingdom for English constituencies
National Democratic and Labour Party MPs
National Liberal Party (UK, 1922) politicians
Social Democratic Federation members
UK MPs 1918–1922